William Lucas Root (1919 – April 22, 2007) was a noted American information theorist. 
As an early pioneer in the field, Root was instrumental in providing a mathematical basis for statistical communication theory.

Root was born in Iowa, receiving his bachelor's degree from Iowa State University in 1940 and master's degree from MIT in 1943, both in electrical engineering. He served as a Marine officer in World War II, in 1952 received his doctorate in mathematics from MIT, and subsequently joined Lincoln Laboratory, serving as head of its analysis group 1959–1961. From 1962 to 1987 he was Professor of Aerospace Engineering at the University of Michigan.

Root was an IEEE Fellow and received the 1986 Claude E. Shannon Award.

References 
 ITSOC obituary
 University of Michigan obituary
 

American information theorists
1919 births
2007 deaths
United States Marine Corps officers
United States Marine Corps personnel of World War II
MIT School of Engineering alumni
Iowa State University alumni
University of Michigan faculty
Fellow Members of the IEEE
MIT Lincoln Laboratory people